Lucian Giușcă (born 28 July 1943) is a Romanian former sports shooter. He competed in the 50 metre pistol event at the 1968 Summer Olympics.

References

1943 births
Living people
Romanian male sport shooters
Olympic shooters of Romania
Shooters at the 1968 Summer Olympics
Sportspeople from Iași